National Knowledge Network (NKN) is a multi-gigabit national research and education network, whose purpose is to provide a unified high speed network backbone for educational and research institutions in India. The network is managed by the National Informatics Centre.

Details 
The NKN is a hierarchical network divided into three basic layers – ultra-high speed CORE (multiples of 10 Gbit/s; Level 1), Distribution (Level 2), and Edge (speeds of 1 Gbit/s or higher; User Level). Depending on the type of connectivity required by the user organization, geographical presence, and the location of Point of Presence (PoP) of NKN, (belonging to Core and Distribution), connectivity would be provided to the institutes. NKN backbone will typically have 18 Core PoPs and around 25 Distribution PoPs across the country. The NKN backbone will be created by multiple bandwidth providers and the edges can be provided by any service provider.

The network is designed to support Overlay Networks, Dedicated Networks, and Virtual Networks. Advanced applications in areas such as Health, Education, Science & Technology, Grid Computing, Bioinformatics, Agriculture, and Governance will be an integral part of NKN. The entire network will seamlessly integrate with the global scientific community at multiple gigabits per second speed.

IP and ASn resources 
National Knowledge Network has got the following resources from APNIC (Regional Internet registry for Asia-Pacific Region).

IPv6 Segment—
 2405:8A00::/32
 2409::/28

IPv4 Segment—
 14.139.0.0/16
 180.149.48.0/20

AS Numbers—
 9885
 55824
 55847

IPv6 implementation 
NKN has got 2405:8A00::/32 IPv6 block from APNIC (Regional Internet registry for Asia-Pacific Region) and allocating /48 block to every connected member institution.
/48 is allocated to connected member so that member institute can do multihoming, if required.

DNSSEC 
NKN is DNSSEC enabled.

Public lectures

Annual workshops

Events

See also 
 National Optical Fibre Network
 ERNET
 National Informatics Centre
 Digital India
 Ministry of Electronics and Information Technology

References 

Sources
 NKN as per DEITY
 NKN Concept, Design and Realization by Prof S V Raghavan
 NKN to cover 1500 institutes. Business Standard
 GARUDA-NKN. Gardua India

External links 
 

 
Ministry of Communications and Information Technology (India)
National Informatics Centre
National research and education networks